Chilliwack-Hope was a provincial electoral district in British Columbia, Canada, established by the Electoral Districts Act, 2008.  It was first contested in the 2009 British Columbia General Election.  The riding was formed from an amalgamation of parts of Chilliwack-Kent, Yale-Lillooet, Chilliwack-Sumas, West Vancouver-Garibaldi, and Maple Ridge-Mission.

History
Due to the realignment of electoral boundaries, most incumbents did not represent the entirety of their listed district during the preceding legislative term. Barry Penner, British Columbia Liberal Party was initially elected during the 2005 election and 2001 election to the Chilliwack-Kent riding.  He successful ran for re-election again in the 2009 election in the Chilliwack-Hope riding.

Penner resigned the seat on January 9, 2012, and Gwen O'Mahony won the subsequent by-election on April 19, 2012.

Results

References

Former provincial electoral districts of British Columbia
Politics of Chilliwack
Provincial electoral districts in Greater Vancouver and the Fraser Valley